Barrô e Aguada de Baixo is a freguesia ("civil parish") in Águeda Municipality, Aveiro District, Portugal. The population in 2011 was 3,209, in an area of 10.19 km2.

History
The freguesia was established in 2013.

References

2013 establishments in Portugal
Freguesias of Águeda
Populated places established in 2013